Siemon Allen (born in Durban, South Africa) is an artist working mainly with installations. He is living and working in the United States. Allen is considered one of the most prominent exponents of the South African arts diaspora in the Northeastern USA.

Life 
Siemon Allen studied fine arts at the Technikon Natal in Durban, where he graduated with a Master of Arts in 1999. During his studies he got to know his future wife, an American, and together they moved to the US later on. Today, Allen is working as a visiting professor at the department for sculpture and extended media at the Virginia Commonwealth University in Richmond, Virginia.

While still living in South Africa, Allen was founding member of the FLAT Gallery (1993–1995) within the context of an artists' initiative.

Allen's works were exhibited at the 2nd Johannesburg Biennale as part of the exhibition "Graft".he hasn't talked mostly about his private life in public life His works are part of many collections in- and outside of South Africa, including the collections of the Durban Art Gallery, the Guggenheim Museum in New York City and the Standard Bank Collection.

Work philosophy 
Siemon Allen is a passionate collector and archivist of South African ephemera, which he uses to create large-scale visual and informational installations. Accordingly, these works are entitled "collection projects" and primarily explore the concept of creating identity through distance and the image of South Africa in general.

For his installations, Allen systematically accumulates mass-produced printed materials, which he catalogues and exhibits. The working process thus is similar to the one of an archivist.
As a South African living abroad, Allen is especially interested in exploring and understanding how a country is seen from outside and what is the country's role in building this image. In the early 2000s he came across a website of the South African government that strongly advertised an appeal for positive branding-politics outside of the country as well as for the recruitment of non-governmental South Africans living abroad to act as "ambassadors" for the country. Allen's installations both debunk this essentialist thought of a South African "brand" and contribute to it.

Allen's actual project is about the creation of a vast, internet-based archive of audio-documents regarding the South African history. The exhibition which resulted from this archive was called "Records" and was shown in South Africa in 2009 and in the US in 2010.

Exhibitions

Solo (selection) 

 2010 Imaging South Africa: Collection Projects by Siemon Allen, Anderson Gallery, VCU, Richmond, VA, USA
 2009 Imaging South Africa: Records, BANK Gallery, Durban, South Africa
 2005 Cards II, FUSEBOX, Washington, DC, USA
 2004 Newspapers (Register), Drake University – Anderson Gallery, Des Moines, IA, USA
 2002 Newspapers (Post/Times), FUSEBOX, Washington, DC, USA
 2001 STAMP COLLECTION – Imaging South Africa, Hemicycle/Corcoran Museum, Washington, DC, USA
 1999 House, Gallery 400, Chicago, IL, USA
 1994 Songs for Nella, FLAT Gallery, Durban, South Africa

Group (selection) 

 2011 Desire, Ideal Narrative in Contemporary South African Art, South African Pavilion, 54. Biennale von Venedig, Venedig, Italy
 2010 Records, The Gordon Schachat Collection — Featured Artist, Johannesburg Art Fair, South Africa
 2009 t.error – your fear is an external object, Hungarian Cultural Center, New York, NY, USA
 2008 Disturbance – Contemporary Art from Scandinavia and South Africa, Johannesburg Art Gallery, South Africa
 2008 T.ERROR, Kunsthalle, Budapest, Hungary
 2008 Hopeless and Otherwise, curated by Valerie Imus, Southern Exposure, San Francisco, USA
 2006 A Fiction of Authenticity: Contemporary Africa Abroad, Blaffer Gallery, Houston, TX, USA
 2006 Other Than Art, G Fine Art, Washington, DC, USA
 2005 Enemy Image, Brooklyn, NY, USA
 2004 Freedom Salon, New York, NY, USA
 2004 Notes on Renewed Appropriationisms, The Project, Los Angeles, CA, USA
 2004 Rear View Mirror, Kettle's Yard, Cambridge, UK
 2004 A Fiction of Authenticity: Contemporary Africa Abroad, Miller Gallery, Carnegie Mellon University, Pittsburgh, PA, USA
 2003 The American Effect, Whitney Museum, New York, NY, USA
 2003 Art Positions, Miami/Basel, Miami, FL, USA
 2003 ARCO, Madrid, Spain
 2002 Context & Conceptualism, Artists Space. New York, NY, USA
 2002 Intersections, RMIT Gallery, Melbourne, Australia
 2001 After the Diagram, White Box, New York, NY, USA
 2000 Open Circuit, NSA Gallery, Durban, South Africa
 1999 Import, Goethe Institute (two-person with Markus Wirthmann), Washington, DC
 1998 Drömmar och Moln, Kulturhuset, Stockholm, Sweden
 1997 Taking Stock, Johannesburg Stock Exchange, South Africa
 1997 2nd Johannesburg Biennale, Graft, South African National Gallery, Kapstadt, South Africa
 1996 Hitch-Hiker, Generator Art Space, Johannesburg, South Africa
 1995 Rembrandt Gallery (three-person with Thomas Barry and Jeremy Wafer), Johannesburg, South Africa
 1994 Vita Art Now 93, Johannesburg Art Gallery, South Africa
 1993 Institute of Contemporary Art (ICA) (two person with Greg Streak), Johannesburg, South Africa

Bibliography 

 Anderson Gallery (Drake University). Siemon Allen – Newspapers: a project by Siemon Allen. Anderson Gallery, Drake University, 2004.
 Allen, Siemon. Siemon Allen – A fiction of authenticity: contemporary Africa abroad. Contemporary Art Museum St. Louis, 2003.
 Allen, Siemon. Siemon Allen – Siemon Allen, 1993–1999, 1999.
 Allen, Siemon. Siemon Allen – The Flat Gallery: a documentation and critical examinination of an informal art organisation in Durban. Flat International, 1999.

References

External links
  Siemon Allen's homepage
  Electric Jive, where Siemon Allen is part of a team blogging about South African music
  flatinternational, Siemon Allen's archive of South African audio
  article on Artsouthafrica.com
  article on Bizcommunity.whatson.co.za
  artist's portfolio on Arts.vcu.edu
  article in the German Monopol Magazin
  article on the blog Esterknows.com
  article on mahala.co.za
  article in Artforum (2004)

Living people
South African contemporary artists
South African installation artists
Conceptual artists
Year of birth missing (living people)